The 1978 AIAW National Large College Basketball Championship was held on March 17–25, 1978.  Sixteen teams were invited, and UCLA Bruins were crowned national champions.

This was the first AIAW Tournament to divide the first two rounds into four regional sites, and also the first to be held over the course of two weekends.  The host site for the Final Four was UCLA in Los Angeles.  The championship game was televised nationally for the first time, by NBC.

Opening rounds

East Regional – New Brunswick, NJ

West Regional – Long Beach, CA

South Regional – Cleveland, MS

Central Regional – Denton, TX

Final Four – Los Angeles, CA

See also
1978 AIAW National Small College Basketball Championship

References

AIAW women's basketball tournament
AIAW
AIAW National Division I Basketball Championship
Basketball in the Dallas–Fort Worth metroplex
1978 in sports in Texas
Women's sports in Texas